Abralia robsoni is a species of enoploteuthid cephalopod found in the waters of Japan. It may be synonymous with A. andamanica.

References

Abralia
Molluscs described in 1931
Taxa named by Georg Grimpe